Second-seeded Louise Brough defeated first-seeded Margaret Osborne 8–6, 4–6, 6–1 in the final to win the women's singles tennis title at the 1947 U.S. National Championships.

Seeds
The tournament used two lists of players for seeding the women's singles event; one for U.S. players and one for foreign players. Louise Brough is the champion; others show in brackets the round in which they were eliminated.

  Margaret Osborne (finalist)
  Louise Brough (champion)
  Doris Hart (semifinals)
  Patricia Todd (quarterfinals)
  Shirley Fry (third round)
  Mary Arnold Prentiss (third round)
  Dorothy Head (quarterfinals)
  Barbara Krase (quarterfinals)
  Nancye Bolton (semifinals)
  Betty Hilton (third round)
  Molly Blair (second round)
  Magda Rurac (quarterfinals)
  Nell Hopman (second round)
  Joy Gannon (first round)
  Jean Quertier (third round)
  Elaine Fildes (first round)

Draw

Final eight

References

1947
1947 in women's tennis
1947 in American women's sports
Women's Singles